Munir Amar (1968 – March 25, 2016) was an Israeli military officer and politician. Amar was killed on 25 March 2016 after his small plane crashed in Upper Galilee.

Biography 
Amar was the Head of the IDF Civil Administration and Brigadier-General. He was killed Friday when his light plane crashed into a mountain in the Upper Galilee, in northern Israel. Amar began his military service in the Herev infantry battalion, the battalion is known for the fierce loyalty and solidarity of its soldiers. Amar eventually rose to command the battalion. Later in his service, Amar was appointed head of the Home Front Command for the Haifa area, and then commander of the Hermon Brigade on Israel's northern border.

At the time of his death, Amar was the chief of the Coordinator of Government Activities in the Territories Unit (COGAT).

References 

Israel Defense Forces
21st-century Israeli politicians
Israeli Civil Administration
Victims of aviation accidents or incidents in Asia
1968 births
2016 deaths